Bhoonja is one of many typical evening snacks consumed in North India. It is available in varied versions under varied names across the North Indian plains.

Ingredients include specially roasted rice, mixture of peanuts, various spiced pulses, seb (salty fried beans), coconut dried-ups, spices, salt and mustard.

References

Indian snack foods